Digitmovies Alternative Entertainment is an Italian label that starts in 2002 the rescue of Italian film music.
Digitmovies AE has released over 100 soundtracks from many Italian original archives such as, C.A.M., Cinevox, Beat Records, EMI General music...

Italian record labels
Record labels established in 2002
2002 establishments in Italy